The Word may refer to:

Christian faith 
Logos (Christianity), a name and title for Jesus Christ
The Bible, a collection of sacred texts central to Christianity
The Word Bible Software, a Bible study software

Media 
The Word (novel), a 1972 novel by Irving Wallace, and a 1978 TV miniseries adaptation
The Word (radio programme), a BBC World Service book programme
The Word (TV series), a British series
"The Word" (The Handmaid's Tale), a television episode
The Wørd, a recurring segment on The Colbert Report TV series
The Word (UK magazine), a music magazine
The Word (free love), a 19th-century anarchist free love magazine edited by Ezra and Angela Heywood
The Words (book), a 1963 autobiography by Jean-Paul Sartre
The Word Network

Film
The Word (1943 film), a 1943 Swedish drama film
The Word (1953 film), a 1953 documentary film
The Word (1955 film) or Ordet, a 1955 Danish film
The Words (film), 2012 American film

Music 
The Word (band), a blues/jam rock group
"The Word" (song), a 1965 song by The Beatles
"The Word", a 2001 song by Sara Groves from the album Conversations
"The Word", a 2007 song by Patti Scialfa from the album Play It as It Lays

Other uses
The Word Bookstore, a philosophy and poetry bookstore in Montreal
The Word (library), South Shields

See also
 Word (disambiguation)